Mikinguni  is an administrative ward in Pangani District of Tanga Region in Tanzania. According to the 2012 census, the ward has a total population of 4,646.

References

Wards of Pangani District
Wards of Tanga Region